Duncraig may refer to:

Duncraig Castle in Scotland
Duncraig railway station, near this castle
Duncraig, Western Australia, a suburb of Perth, Western Australia
Duncraig Senior High School